Lieutenant-Commander Gerard Broadmead Roope  (13 March 1905 – 8 April 1940) was a posthumous British recipient of the Victoria Cross, the highest and most prestigious award for gallantry in the face of the enemy awarded to British and Commonwealth forces.

A 35-year-old Royal Navy officer, his action was the earliest awarded a Victoria Cross in the Second World War (although the award was not gazetted until after hostilities ended) and is one of very few to have the award justified, in part, from a recommendation and supporting evidence provided by the enemy.

Early life, education, and early naval career
Roope was born at Hillbrook, Trull, near Taunton in Somerset, son of Gerard Roope, described as a "gentleman of independent means", and Florence, daughter of Thomas Palfrey Broadmead, JP, of Enmore Castle, Somerset. The Broadmead family had owned Enmore Castle since the 1830s, becoming part of the landed gentry.

He was educated at the Royal Naval College, Dartmouth from the age of 13, and on 15 January 1923 was appointed a midshipman in the gunroom of the battle-cruiser HMS Revenge. He subsequently served as a sub-lieutenant on the Concord and the Caledon, and on the Marlborough as a lieutenant, before taking command of the G-class destroyer HMS Glowworm on 22 July 1938.

Gallantry in action

On 8 April 1940, in the Norwegian Sea, the destroyer HMS Glowworm (1,345 tons), commanded by Lt-Cdr Roope, engaged two enemy destroyers while heading alone to Norway's West Fjord. After one of the enemy ships was hit, they both broke off and retreated to the north. Though aware that the enemy destroyers were attempting to draw him towards German capital ships, he gave chase. Glowworm soon spotted the German cruiser Admiral Hipper (14,000 tons). He alerted the Home Fleet before turning to engage the cruiser. Glowworm fired ten torpedoes but scored no hits and was soon battered by enemy rounds and set on fire. With only three guns still firing, the heavily damaged destroyer ended up ramming the cruiser, gouging open several holes in her hull and destroying her forward starboard torpedo mounting. Glowworm then fired one more salvo, scoring a hit, before she capsized and sank. Of the crew of 149, one officer and 30 men survived and were chivalrously picked up by the Admiral Hipper. Lt-Cdr Roope drowned in the course of assisting the rescue of survivors. The Admiral Hipper'''s commander, Kapitän zur See Hellmuth Heye, wrote to the British authorities via the Red Cross, recommending award of the VC for his opponent's courage in engaging a vastly superior warship.

The medal

The citation reads:

The award was presented to his widow on 12 February 1946. This Victoria Cross is currently in private ownership and is not on public display.

Personal life
Roope married Faith Dulcibella (1907–2001), daughter of George Frederick Clarke, of St Mary's Lodge, Argyle Road, Walton St Mary, Clevedon, Somerset, of a landed gentry family of Bridwell, Devon, and Theodora, daughter of Rev. John Benson Sidgwick, rector of Ashby Parva, Leicestershire.Diary of a Devonshire Squire, John Were Clarke and William Percival Authers, Authers Publishing, 1982, p. 28 The Roopes lived at Richmond, then part of Surrey (now Greater London) and had a son and daughter.

Literary reference
The novel Battle of the April Storm, by Larry Forrester, is based upon the action between Glowworm and Hipper. The characters are fictional, including the Glowworm's captain, but the story depicts an "unlucky" ship that is redeemed by an heroic final action and, at the end, the fellowship between mariners, even enemies.

See also
 Sergeant Thomas Frank Durrant VC (1918–1942), whose award was supported by a recommendation from Kapitänleutnant'' F. K. Paul after the St Nazaire raid
 Flying Officer Lloyd Trigg VC DFC (1914–1943), whose VC award was supported solely with a recommendation by and evidence from an officer in the Kriegsmarine

References

British VCs of World War 2 (John Laffin, 1997)
Monuments to Courage (David Harvey, 1999)
The Register of the Victoria Cross (This England, 1997)
Bravest of the Brave (John Glansfield, 2005)

External links
 CWGC entry
Profile at the Dorset Page

1905 births
1940 deaths
Military personnel from Somerset
People from Taunton
Royal Navy officers
Royal Navy officers of World War II
Royal Navy personnel killed in World War II
Captains who went down with the ship
Royal Navy recipients of the Victoria Cross
British World War II recipients of the Victoria Cross
People lost at sea
Graduates of Britannia Royal Naval College